Dalhousie Preparatory School was a private preparatory school in Scotland.

Dalhousie was established in 1925 by Kenneth M Mylne at Dalhousie Castle, Bonnyrigg, 8 miles south of Edinburgh. Mylne had previously been headmaster of the preparatory branch of Merchiston Castle School for five years.  In 1950 the school moved to new premises at Melville House near Cupar in Fife. The school closed in 1970.

Notable alumni
 Chris Baur
 Robert Angus Brooks
Abid Bhat

References

Educational institutions established in 1925
Educational institutions disestablished in 1970
Defunct schools in Fife
Defunct private schools in Scotland
Defunct preparatory schools in Scotland
Defunct boarding schools in Scotland
Defunct boys' schools in Scotland
1925 establishments in Scotland
1970 disestablishments in Scotland